South Worcestershire was a parliamentary constituency which returned one Member of Parliament (MP) to the House of Commons of the Parliament of the United Kingdom, elected by the first past the post voting system.

The constituency was created for the 1950 general election, and abolished for the 1997 general election.

History

Boundaries 
1950–1974: The Municipal Borough of Evesham, the Urban District of Malvern, and the Rural Districts of Evesham, Pershore, and Upton-on-Severn.

1974–1983: As prior but with redrawn boundaries.

1983–1997: The District of Wychavon wards of Badsey, Bredon, Bretforton and Offenham, Broadway, Eckington, Elmley Castle, Evesham East, Evesham Hampton, Evesham North, Evesham South, Evesham West, Fladbury, Harvington and Norton, Honeybourne and Pebworth, Pershore Holy Cross, Pershore St Andrew's, Somerville, South Bredon Hill, The Littletons, and Wickhamford, and the District of Malvern Hills wards of Chase, Kempsey, Langland, Link, Longdon, Morton, Powyke, Priory, Ripple, The Hanleys, Trinity, Upton-on-Severn, Wells, and West.

The main settlements in the seat were Great Malvern, Pershore, and the market town of Evesham. At the 1997 general election, Great Malvern and Pershore were transferred to the new seat of West Worcestershire and Evesham was transferred to the redrawn seat of Mid Worcestershire.

Members of Parliament

Election results

Elections in the 1950s

Elections in the 1960s

Elections in the 1970s

Elections in the 1980s

Election in the 1990s

Notes and references

Parliamentary constituencies in Worcestershire (historic)
Constituencies of the Parliament of the United Kingdom established in 1950
Constituencies of the Parliament of the United Kingdom disestablished in 1997